Les Hauts et les bas de Sophie Paquin (The Highs and Lows of Sophie Paquin) is a Canadian television comedy-drama series, which premiered on Radio-Canada in 2006. The show stars Suzanne Clément as Sophie Paquin, a single mother and businesswoman who operates her own talent agency.

The cast also includes Éric Bernier, Élise Guilbault, Jean-Nicolas Verreault, Pauline Martin, Isabelle Vincent, Christiane Pasquier, Catherine De Léan, Danny Blanco Hall, François Létourneau and Anthony Lemke. The show was created by Richard Blaimert and its executive producer is Jocelyn Deschênes.

In 2008, CBC Television began airing an English-language adaptation, Sophie, which was also created by Blaimert and produced by Deschênes.

External links
 Les Hauts et les bas de Sophie Paquin
 

2006 Canadian television series debuts
2009 Canadian television series endings
Ici Radio-Canada Télé original programming
Téléromans
2000s Canadian comedy-drama television series